Alles ist die Sekte ("The cult is everything"), abbreviated A.i.d.S and formerly called RoyalTS, is a German hip hop duo from Berlin, composed of the rappers Sido and B-Tight.

History

After several releases through Royal Bunker, they moved to Aggro Berlin.
They did support gigs for American hip hop groups Hieroglyphics and The Arsonists.
Today, A.i.d.S. forms the core of Die Sekte. Sido and B-Tight are now better known for their solo albums; Sido's Maske was one of the most successful German hip hop releases in 2004.

Discography

 1998: Wissen Flow Talent
 1999: Sintflows (with Rhymin Simon and Collins)
 2000: Back in Dissniss
 2001: Alles ist die Sekte
 2001: Das Mic und Ich
 2001: Ihr Nutten
 2002: Alles ist die Sekte Album Nr. 3
 2003: Gar nich so schlimm!
 2009: Die Sekte

External links
Official website

German hip hop groups